Bolivia competed at the 2019 Pan American Games in Lima, Peru from July 26 to August 11, 2019.

Bolivia's consisted of 49 athletes (28 men and 21 women), the highest the country has ever sent to one edition of the Pan American Games. On July 4, 2019, racquetball athlete Conrrado Moscoso was named as the country's flag bearer during the opening ceremony.

On August 10th 2019, Carlos Keller, Roland Keller and Conrrado Moscoso won the gold medal in the racquetball men's team competition, surpassing the bronze medal won four years earlier in at the 2015 Pan American Games in Toronto. Reserve Kadim Carrasco was also awarded a medal. This marked Bolivia's first ever gold medal at the Pan American Games. Overall the country won five medals, the most at any edition of the games, and ranked 19th overall.

Competitors
The following is the list of number of competitors (per gender) participating at the games per sport/discipline.

Medalists
The following competitors from Bolivia won medals at the games. In the by discipline sections below, medalists' names are bolded.

|  style="text-align:left; width:78%; vertical-align:top;"|

|  style="text-align:left; width:26%; vertical-align:top;"|

Archery

Bolivia qualified a recurve women's team of three athletes by finishing in the top six at the 2018 Pan American Championships in Medellín, Colombia.

Athletics (track and field)

Bolivia qualified five track and field athletes (three men and two women).

Key
Note–Ranks given for track events are for the entire round
PB = Personal best
SB = Seasonal best
DSQ = Disqualified

Track and road events

Badminton

Bolivia received a reallocated quota spot for a female athlete. This marked the country's Pan American Games debut in the sport.

Women

Basque pelota

Bolivia qualified one male athlete in basque pelota.

Men

Bodybuilding

Bolivia qualified a full team of two bodybuilders (one male and one female).

No results were provided for the prejudging round, with only the top six advancing.

Canoeing

Slalom
Bolivia qualified one male canoe slalom athlete. This marked the country's debut in the discipline at the Pan American Games.

Key
Note–Ranks given are within the heat
Men

Cycling

Bolivia qualified one male cyclist in the BMX discipline. Bolivia was later reallocated an additional quota in men's BMX and a women's quota in the road/track events.

BMX
Men

Road
Women

Track
Women
Keirin

Omnium

Equestrian

Bolivia qualified one athlete in equestrian.

Jumping

Golf

Bolivia qualified two female golfers.

Women

Gymnastics

Artistic
Bolivia qualified one male and one female artistic gymnast. Bolivia was later reallocated an additional female quota.

Men

Women

Karate

Bolivia qualified one male karateka in the 84 kg kumite event, after finishing in the top two qualifying positions from the 2018 South American Games.

Kumite
Men

Modern pentathlon

Bolivia qualified four modern pentathletes (two men and two women). The team was officially named on May 21, 2019.

Individual

Relay

Racquetball

Bolivia qualified seven racquetball athletes (four men and three women).

Men

Kadim Carrasco did not compete in any matches.

Women

Shooting

Bolivia qualified seven sport shooters (five men and two women).

Men

Women

Mixed

Swimming

Bolivia qualified four swimmers (three men and one women).

Tennis

Bolivia qualified three tennis players (two men and one woman).

Triathlon

Bolivia received one wild card in the men's individual competition. Madde became the first Bolivian to finish the competition, as all previous representatives were unable too.

Men

References

Nations at the 2019 Pan American Games
2019
2019 in Bolivian sport